Baubotanik is a term that describes a building method in which architectural structures are created through the interaction of technical joints and plant growth.   The term entails the practice of designing and building living structures using living plants. In this regard, living and non-living elements are intertwined in such a way that they grow together into plant-technical composite structures.

The Baubotanik method combines the aesthetic and ecological qualities of living trees with the static functions and structural requirements of buildings, thereby reducing the need for artificial building materials. The structures provide valuable habitats for a variety of animal species and make conventional foundations redundant, due to their root anchorage.

The use of Baubotanik is not a new invention and can be found in various historical and cultural contexts, such as the Tanzlinden (“dancing lime”) tree in Germany and living root bridge in North-East India. Common in the Indian state of Meghalaya and grown by the Khasi and Jaintia, the bridges consist of the aerial roots of rubber fig trees (Ficus elastica) and are grown over rivers to form walkable bridges. While the process can take fifteen years to complete, the bridges can be reinforced with natural materials and can withstand the strongest tropical storms. Furthermore, since the turn of the millennium, ‘willow churches’ (made of willow rods and lacking a fixed roof) have been constructed on various former garden show grounds, yet provide only limited functionality as buildings.

Research
An early publication in this field of study was the article Baubotanik: Mit lebenden Pflanzen konstruieren (translating to “Baubotanik: Designing with Living Plants) by Ferdinand Ludwig in 2005 in the magazine Baumeister. The term “Baubotanik” was defined in 2007 at the Institute of Theory of Architecture and Design (Institut für Grundlagen moderner Architektur und Entwerfen) at the University of Stuttgart, where its concept was scientifically further developed. Within the scope of the research, simple experimental buildings were constructed, such as a footbridge and a Baubotanik tower that illustrated the possibilities of creating larger Baubotanik structures by adding individual plants. Moreover, a two-story bird-watching station was planted in the town of Waldkirchen as part of the Bavarian State Horticultural Show 2007. Subsequently, a three-story plane tree cube was created for the Baden-Württemberg State Horticultural Show 2012 in Nagold.

Since 2017, the Baubotanik field of research has been based at the Professorship for Green Technologies in Landscape Architecture at the Technical University of Munich.

See also

Literature
 Middleton, Wilfrid & Habibi, Amin & Shankar, Sanjeev & Ludwig, Ferdinand. (2020). Characterizing Regenerative Aspects of Living Root Bridges. Sustainability. 12. 10.3390/su12083267. Open access article link
 Well, Friederike & Ludwig, Ferdinand. (2020). Blue-green architecture: A case study analysis considering the synergetic effects of water and vegetation. 9. 191–202. 10.1016/j.foar.2019.11.001. Open access article link
 Ludwig, Ferdinand & Middleton, Wilfrid & Gallenmüller, Friederike & Rogers, Patrick & Speck, Thomas. (2019). Living bridges using aerial roots of ficus elastica – an interdisciplinary perspective. Scientific Reports. 9. 10.1038/s41598-019-48652-w. Open access article link
 Ludwig, Ferdinand & Schönle, Daniel & Vees, Ute. (2016). Baubotanik - Building Architecture with Nature. International Online Journal Biotope City. PDF download and open access article link
 Ludwig, Ferdinand & Mihaylov, Boyan & Schwinn, Tobias. (2013). Emergent Timber: A tool for designing the growth process of Baubotanik structures PDF download and open access article link

External links
 Ferdinand Ludwig, TEDxTUM, Designing living buildings with trees
 Faculty of Architecture, Technical University of Munich, GTLA research (Professorship of Green Technologies in Landscape Architecture)
 Baubotanik shapes living tree branches into building facades Youtube video: Kirsten Dirksen
 Baubotanik: Ein Hybrid von Natur und Technik Youtube video: EGGER Group
 ArchDaily: Baubotanik - The Botanically Inspired Design System That Creates Living Buildings ArchDaily
 Grow Your Own Building with Baubotanik Architecture Grow Your Own Building with Baubotanik Architecture

References

Sustainable architecture
Buildings and structures
Architectural design
Sustainable building
Environmental engineering
Trees